Skyline Attractions, LLC is an American amusement ride and roller coaster design and manufacturing company founded in 2014 and based in Orlando, Florida. The company also includes a subsidiary company, Skyline Design, LLC, which offers design services inside and outside the amusement industry.

The company has manufactured 5 roller coasters in the United States, and has designed multiple roller coasters for other manufacturers as well. Along with manufacturing roller coasters, Skyline Attractions also manufactures flat rides.

List of roller coasters

As of 2023, Skyline Attractions has manufactured 5 roller coasters around the world.

(•) = track produced by Rocky Mountain Construction

In addition to manufacturing its own roller coasters, Skyline Design has designed roller coasters for other manufacturers.

List of flat rides
Outside of roller coasters, Skyline Attractions has also manufactured a variety of flat rides.

References

Roller coaster manufacturers
Manufacturing companies based in Florida
Companies based in Orlando, Florida
American companies established in 2014
Manufacturing companies established in 2014
2014 establishments in Florida